Lianna Narbekova (born 6 June 1997) is an Uzbekistani footballer who plays as a forward for Women's Championship club Sogdiana and the Uzbekistan women's national team.

International career
Narbekova capped for Uzbekistan at senior level during the 2018 AFC Women's Asian Cup qualification, a 1–1 friendly draw against India and the 2019 Hope Cup.

Internationalgoals

See also
List of Uzbekistan women's international footballers

References 

1997 births
Living people
Uzbekistani women's footballers
Uzbekistan women's international footballers
Women's association football forwards
Sportspeople from Tashkent
21st-century Uzbekistani women